Reliant Air is a regional and charter airline based in Danbury, Connecticut, USA. With its main base at Danbury Municipal Airport, it provides scheduled service to Nantucket and operates charters to other destinations.

History 

The airline was established and started operations in 1988. Reliant Air has been in continuous service since then, under the same private ownership. In 2007, a fire had burned down the original hangar/headquarters at Danbury Municipal Airport, but has since been rebuilt and continues in operation. This is the only passenger airline to operate a scheduled service out of Danbury.

Destinations for Scheduled Flights

Fleet 
, the Reliant Air fleet consists of the following aircraft:

References

External links
Reliant Air

Regional airlines of the United States
Regional Airline Association members
Companies based in Fairfield County, Connecticut
Companies based in Danbury, Connecticut
Transportation in Fairfield County, Connecticut
Airlines established in 1988
Charter airlines of the United States
Airlines based in Connecticut